TDT may refer to:
 Digital terrestrial television
 TDT (TV station), a digital television station in Tasmania, Australia
 TDT (Portugal), digital terrestrial television in Portugal
 TDT (Spain), digital terrestrial television in Spain
 TDT Band (The Down Troddence), a six piece Indian thrash metal band
 TDT Banda or Thamar Dillon Thomas Banda (fl. 1957–1962), Nyasaland politician
 Terminal deoxynucleotidyl transferase, a specialized DNA polymerase expressed in immune cells
 Terrestrial Dynamical Time, an obsolete name for Terrestrial Time
 The Damned Things, an American heavy metal supergroup
 Time domain transmissometry, a method of testing transmission lines
 Toronto Dance Theatre, a Canadian modern dance company based in Toronto, Ontario
 Tracing Debugging Technique, an early debugger by DEC
 Transmission disequilibrium test, a family-based genetic association test
 The Dark Tower (series), a book series written by Stephen King.